Elections to Penwith District Council were held on 4 May 2000.  One third of the council was up for election and the council stayed under no overall control. Overall turnout was 30.9%

After the election, the composition of the council was
Conservative 10
Independent 9
Liberal Democrat 7
Others 5
Labour 3

Results

References

2000 Penwith election result
Turnout figures

2000 English local elections
2000
2000s in Cornwall